Henryk Śniegocki (January 18, 1893 in Kościan – December 1, 1971 in Poznań) was a teacher and a participant in the Greater Poland Uprising (1918–1919). He was a leader of a Regional Scout Command of Wielkopolska in the Polish Scouts in interwar Poland, 1925–1927. He commanded the underground Polish Scout movement during the German occupation of Poland.

See also
History of the Scout movement in Poland
Scouting in Poland

Polish Scouts and Guides
1893 births
1971 deaths
Member of the Tomasz Zan Society